Cape Berg (Mys Berga) is a headland in Severnaya Zemlya, Russia.

This cape was named after prominent Soviet geographer and biologist Lev Berg (1876 –  1950).

Geography
Stretching out towards the Laptev Sea east of the Rusanov Glacier, Cape Berg is the northeasternmost point of October Revolution Island.

History
The shore of present-day Severnaya Zemlya was discovered by Boris Vilkitsky in 1913 during the Arctic Ocean Hydrographic Expedition on behalf of the Russian Hydrographic Service.
On 3 September 1913 members of the expedition went to the shore near Cape Berg, on what is now known as October Revolution Island. They raised the Russian flag on the shore and named the new territory Tayvay Land (Zemlya Tayway), after the first syllable of their icebreaker's names (Taymyr & Vaygach), charting parts of the Laptev Sea coast of what they believed to be a single island. Later the new discovery was named Emperor Nicholas II Land, (Russian: Zemlya Imperatora Nikolaya II), after Emperor Nicholas II of Russia.

Further reading
William J. Mills, Exploring Polar Frontiers: A Historical Encyclopedia, Volume 1
Nicholas II Land, Bulletin of the American Geographical Society Vol. 46, No. 2 (1914), pp. 117-120

References

Berg
Berg
Berg